The 1998 Northwestern Wildcats football team represented Northwestern University during the 1998 NCAA Division I-A football season. They played their home games at Ryan Field and participated as members of the Big Ten Conference. They were coached by Gary Barnett, who resigned at the conclusion of the regular season to become the head coach at Colorado.

Schedule

Roster

References

Northwestern
Northwestern Wildcats football seasons
Northwestern Wildcats football